Jack McGill may refer to:

Jack McGill (ice hockey b. 1909) (1909–1988), ice hockey player
Jack McGill (ice hockey b. 1921) (1921–1994), ice hockey player
Jack McGill (Canadian football) (born c. 1927), Canadian football player

See also
John McGill (disambiguation)